The 1984–85 season was Manchester United's 83rd season in the Football League, and their 10th consecutive season in the top division of English football. They defeated Everton 1–0 in the FA Cup Final to win the trophy for the sixth time, and finished fourth in the league. It was the first season at the club for new signings Gordon Strachan, Jesper Olsen and Alan Brazil, while Mark Hughes became established in the forward line alongside Frank Stapleton, with Norman Whiteside moving into central midfield to replace the departed Ray Wilkins. Hughes ended the season as United's top scorer with 24 goals (16 in the league) and was also voted PFA Young Player of the Year. Brazil, however, failed to establish himself as a regular player, with Atkinson alternating between him and Frank Stapleton as the club's second striker to play alongside the prolific Hughes.

United began the season with four successive draws, having led in three of them, and remained unbeaten in their opening 11 matches (eight in the league) before going down 3–0 at Aston Villa. Their next away trip resulted in a 5–0 thrashing at Everton, and league form was somewhat erratic throughout the season. Before Christmas, United squandered 2–0 leads in further defeats at Sunderland and Nottingham Forest, and on Boxing Day they were beaten 2–1 at bottom club Stoke City, again after taking the lead.

United entered 1985 unbeaten at Old Trafford to stay in contention at the top of the table, but lost successive home matches to Sheffield Wednesday and Coventry City, before embarking on a 10-match unbeaten run which took in big wins over Villa (Hughes scoring a hat-trick) and Stoke. Defeats at Hillsborough and Luton – not to mention the exceptional form of a resurgent Everton – effectively ended United's title hopes, and a 5–1 defeat at Watford in their final fixture saw them overhauled by both Liverpool and Tottenham Hotspur to finish fourth.

By that stage, the players' thoughts were probably elsewhere as they prepared for an FA Cup Final showdown with champions Everton. United's path to Wembley had seen them ease past Bournemouth, Coventry, Blackburn Rovers and West Ham United to set up a semi-final clash with Liverpool. United led twice but had to settle for a 2–2 draw, and a Paul McGrath own goal left them trailing at half-time in the replay before fine goals by Bryan Robson and Hughes saw them through.

An uneventful final came to life 12 minutes from time when, with the score goalless, Kevin Moran was dismissed by referee Peter Willis for a 'professional foul' on Peter Reid – the first ever sending-off in an FA Cup final. United's ten men held on to force extra time, where they found extra reserves of energy and won the trophy thanks to Whiteside's brilliant curling effort in the 110th minute.

United exited the Milk Cup at the third round stage as Everton came from behind to beat them 2–1 at Old Trafford. The UEFA Cup campaign took United to the quarter-final but defeat on penalties against Videoton of Hungary would prove to be their final European fixture for five years. They had qualified to compete in the 1985–86 European Cup Winners' Cup, as the Heysel disaster involving Liverpool and Juventus fans at the European Cup final 11 days later resulted in all English clubs being banned from European competitions for an indefinite period. The ban would not be lifted until 1990.

First Division

FA Cup

League Cup

UEFA Cup

Squad statistics

Transfers

In

Out

References

Manchester United F.C. seasons
Manchester United